Jan Koch (born 4 November 1995) is a German footballer who plays as a centre back for SGV Freiberg.

External links

1995 births
Living people
German footballers
Association football defenders
3. Liga players
Regionalliga players
Czech First League players
Chemnitzer FC players
SpVgg Unterhaching players
FK Mladá Boleslav players
Berliner AK 07 players
FC Energie Cottbus players
SGV Freiberg players
German expatriate footballers
German expatriate sportspeople in the Czech Republic
Expatriate footballers in the Czech Republic